Otto Herbert Schmitt (April 6, 1913 – January 6, 1998) was an American inventor, engineer, and biophysicist known for his scientific contributions to biophysics and for establishing the field of biomedical engineering.  Schmitt also coined the term biomimetics and invented or co-invented the Schmitt trigger, the differential amplifier, and the chopper-stabilized amplifier.

He was elected in 1953 a Fellow of the American Physical Society. He was awarded the John Price Wetherill Medal in 1972.

References

“Biomimetic.” Merriam-Webster.com. 2013. Web. April 15, 2013.
Geddes, Leslie A. "Personal Recollections Of Otto Schmitt. Otto Knew How To Get People's Attention." IEEE Engineering In Medicine And Biology Magazine: The Quarterly Magazine Of The Engineering In Medicine & Biology Society 23.6 (2004): 60-61. MEDLINE with Full Text. Web. 19 Mar. 2013.
Harkness, Jon M. "In Appreciation A Lifetime Of Connections: Otto Herbert Schmitt, 1913-1998." Physics In Perspective 4.4 (2002): 456. Academic Search Complete. Web. 19 Mar. 2013.
Patterson, Robert. "The Contributions Of Otto H. Schmitt. More Than The Schmitt Trigger." IEEE Engineering In Medicine And Biology Magazine: The Quarterly Magazine Of The Engineering In Medicine & Biology Society 23.6 (2004): 19. MEDLINE with Full Text. Web. 19 Mar. 2013.
Schmitt, Francis O. The Never-Ceasing Search. Vol. 188. Philadelphia: American Philosophilcal Society, 1990. Print. Memoirs.
Valentinuzzi, Max E. "Otto Herbert Arnold Schmitt (1913-1998), A Pioneer. Overview Of His Scientific Production." IEEE Engineering In Medicine And Biology Magazine: The Quarterly Magazine Of The Engineering In Medicine & Biology Society 23.6 (2004): 42-46. MEDLINE with Full Text. Web. 19 Mar. 2013.

External links
 Biomimetic Charitable Foundation
 The Bakken Library and Museum, A Lifetime of Connections: Otto Herbert Schmitt, 1913-1998
 Otto H. Schmitt Online Interpretive Center, maintained by the University of Minnesota.
 

1913 births
1998 deaths
American people of German descent
American biophysicists
Washington University physicists
20th-century American engineers
20th-century American inventors
Fellows of the American Physical Society